Vincetoxicum tsaii is a species of plant in the family Apocynaceae first described in 1941. It is endemic to Yunnan Province in China.

The species is listed as vulnerable.

References

Flora of Yunnan
tsaii
Vulnerable plants
Plants described in 1941
Taxonomy articles created by Polbot